The 36th Separate Guards Motor Rifle Brigade is an infantry brigade of the Russian Ground Forces, which traces its heritage to the creation of the 38th Guards Rifle Division from the 4th Airborne Corps during World War II. The division gained its honorific on 23 September 1943 for its part in the seizure of Lozovaya in Ukraine.

In June 1957, the 38th Guards Rifle Division was reorganised as the 38th Guards Motor Rifle Division. The division was moved to Sretensk in Chita Oblast in 1967. In 1989 the division was reorganised as the 131st Guards Machine-Gun Artillery Division.

The division moved its headquarters to Olavyannaya in Olovyanninsky District in Chita Oblast in 1992. In 2001 it was converted into a motor rifle division. In June 2009 the division was reorganised as a motor rifle brigade and moved to Borzya.

The brigade took part in the 2022 Russian invasion of Ukraine.

External links

Mechanised infantry brigades of Russia
Military units and formations established in 2009